The Tri-States Monument (also known as Tri-State Rock) is a granite monument that marks the tripoint of the state boundaries of New Jersey, New York, and Pennsylvania. It is at the northwestern end of the boundary between New Jersey and New York, the northern end of the boundary between New Jersey and Pennsylvania, and the eastern end of the boundary between New York and Pennsylvania. The monument is located at the confluence of the Delaware and Neversink rivers. This location is also known as Carpenter's Point.

The nearby Witness Monument, also known as the Reference Monument or the western State Line Monument, is a taller upright granite monument located south of the Laurel Grove Cemetery in Port Jervis, New York, and under a bridge for Interstate 84. It is not directly on any state boundary, but instead witnesses the location of two points: this tripoint and the corner boundary point between New York and Pennsylvania in the Delaware River.

The Supreme Court of the United States summarized the boundaries of these three states with respect to this monument in New Jersey v. New York, 283 U.S. 336 (1931):

Also, it is the northernmost point of New Jersey, in Montague Township, Sussex County.

Background
In 1664, King Charles II of England granted his brother, James, the Duke of York, a Royal colony that covered what had been New Netherlands. Later in 1664, the Duke of York divided this area between the Hudson River and the Delaware River to Sir George Carteret and Lord Berkeley of Stratton. The western and northern border was to be:

History
In December 1872, the New Jersey Geological Survey had the State Geologist, George H. Cook, survey the boundary between New Jersey and New York. In 1874, the U.S. Coast and Geodetic Survey recovered the previous crow foot cut marking the station location and placed a lead-filled copper pipe in a deep hole drilled into the bedrock. In 1882, this copper bolt was replaced with a granite monument similar to the witness monument. But ice flows broke off the upper portion by the spring of 1883. The remaining monument was then reworked on May 21, 1885 to its current description.

Description

The top surface is engraved with the initials of the names of the three states and with grooves representing the state boundaries. "Tri States Monument" is engraved on the north side. It is by the water's edge near the high-water mark of the rivers. A bronze U.S. National Geodetic Survey survey marker stamped LAUREL NO. 2 1942 was in the center of the top surface until 2013. Both were set in 1942.

The Witness Monument is inscribed "Boundary Monument" and dated 1882 on both sides. "Witness Monument" is engraved on the east side. The New Jersey (south) side details the location of the tripoint: It also lists the commissioners from New Jersey: Abraham Browning, Thomas N. McCarter, and George H. Cook; and surveyor Edward A. Bowser. The New York (north) side details the location of the corner boundary point between New York and Pennsylvania: And lists the commissioners from New York: Henry R. Pierson, Chauncey M. Depew, Elias W. Leavenworth; and surveyor H. W. Clarke.

Gallery

See also
 New York – New Jersey Line War
 New York–Pennsylvania border
 List of extreme points of U.S. states and territories
 Tri-state area

References

External links
 

Borders of New Jersey
Borders of New York (state)
Borders of Pennsylvania
Monuments and memorials in New Jersey
Monuments and memorials in New York (state)
Monuments and memorials in Pennsylvania
Boundary markers
Border tripoints